Abhishek Dhananjay Suryavanshi (born 12 March 2001) is an Indian professional footballer who plays as a midfielder for ATK Mohun Bagan in the Indian Super League.

Career statistics

Club

References

External links

2001 births
Living people
Footballers from Maharashtra
Indian footballers
Association football midfielders
ATK Mohun Bagan FC players